Nationality words link to articles with information on the nation's poetry or literature (for instance, Irish or France).

Events
 March 28 – Spanish poet Miguel Hernández dies of tuberculosis as a political prisoner in a prison hospital having scrawled his last verse on the wall.
 April 3 – French poet Paul Éluard (Eugène Paul Grindel)'s poem "Liberté" is first published in the collection Poésie et vérité ("Poetry and truth") in Paris. In June it is reprinted by the magazine Fontaine, titled "Une seule pensée", to reach Vichy France. It is published by Éditions de Minuit and printed in London by the official Gaullist magazine La France libre. Thousands of copies are parachuted into Occupied France by aircraft of the British Royal Air Force.
 October – English poet Keith Douglas takes part in the Second Battle of El Alamein (against orders).
 December – BIM magazine founded in Barbados.
 American poet George Oppen forces his induction into the U.S. Army.
 Preview, a small literary magazine, is founded in Canada (merged with First Statement in 1945 to form Northern Review, which lasts until 1956); it is published by F. R. Scott, A. J. M. Smith, A. M. Klein and P. K. Page, led by English-born poet and travel writer Patrick Anderson.
 First Statement, a mimeographed, small literary magazine, is founded in Canada (merged with Preview in 1945); it is published by John Sutherland; Irving Layton and Louis Dudek are also involved.
 French poet André Breton delivers a lecture entitled "Situation du surealisme entre les deux guerres" at Yale University.

Works published
Listed by nation where the work was first published and again by the poet's native land, if different; substantially revised works listed separately:

Canada
 Earle Birney, David and Other Poems, the title piece, David, a long, narrative poem, was one of the most frequently taught poems in Canadian schools for decades Governor General's Award, 1942.
 Arthur Bourinot, Canada at Dieppe.
 Ralph Gustafson ed., Anthology of Canadian Poetry, including work by F. R. Scott, A. M. Klein, A. J. M. Smith, Leo Kennedy , E. J. Pratt, Finch, Dorothy Livesay, P. K. Page and Earle Birney; Penguin
 Anne Marriott, Salt Marsh, Toronto: Ryerson Press.

India, in English
 Sri Aurobindo, Collected Poems and Plays (Poetry & Plays in English), in two volumes, Pondicherry: Sri Aurobindo Ashram
 Raul De Loyola Furtado, also known as Joseph Furtado, Selected Poems (Poetry in English), Bombay: published by the author in a limited edition of 100 copies (second edition, revised 1947; third edition, revised 1967)
 P. R. Kaikini, The Snake in the Moon (Poetry in English), Bombay: New Book Co.
 Poetry in War Time (Poetry in English), London: Faber and Faber; anthology; Indian poetry, published in the United Kingdom
 Manjeri Sundaraman, Penumbra

United Kingdom and Ireland
 Walter de la Mare, Collected Poems
 Morwenna Donnelly, Beauty and Ashes
 T. S. Eliot, Little Gidding, long poem, last of his Four Quartets, published in The New English Weekly September
 Roy Fuller, The Middle of a War
 W. S. Graham, Cage Without Grievance
 John Heath-Stubbs, Wounded Thammuz
 J. F. Hendry, The Bombed Happiness
 Agnes Grozier Herbertson, This is the Hour: Poems
 Patrick Kavanagh, The Great Hunger
 Sidney Keyes, The Iron Laurel
 Alun Lewis, Raiders' Dawn, and Other Poems, on a soldier's life in the World War II
 Robert Nichols, Such Was My Singing
 Leslie Norris, Tongue of Beauty
 William Plomer, In a Bombed House, 1941: Elegy in Memory of Anthony Butts
 Poetry in Wartime: An Anthology, edited by Tambimuttu, London: Faber and Faber
 John Pudney, Dispersal Point, and Other Air Poems, including "For Johnny"
 Henry Reed, "Naming of Parts", part 1 of his "Lessons of the War" sequence, published in the New Statesman August 8
 Stevie Smith, Mother, What is Man?
 Stephen Spender, Ruins and Visions
 Dorothy Wellesley, Lost Planet, and Other Poems

United States
 Conrad Aiken, Brownstone Eclogues
 Stephen Vincent Benét, They Burned the Books
 John Berryman, Poems
 R. P. Blackmur, The Second World
 John Malcolm Brinnin:
 The Garden Is Political
 The Lincoln Lyrics
 Malcolm Cowley, A Dry Season
 Robert Frost, A Witness Tree
 Langston Hughes, Shakespeare in Harlem
 Randall Jarrell, Blood for a Stranger
 Edna St. Vincent Millay, The Murder of Lidice
 Kenneth Patchen, The Teeth of the Lion
 Muriel Rukeyser, Wake Island
 Karl Shapiro:
 Person, Place and Thing
 The Place of Love
 Wallace Stevens:
 Parts of a World, includes "The Poems of Our Climate," "The Well Dressed Man with a Beard," and "Examination of the Hero in a Time of War", Knopf
Notes Toward a Supreme Fiction, Cummington Press
 Mark Van Doren, Our Lady Peace
 Margaret Walker, For My People
 Robert Penn Warren, Eleven Poems on the Same Theme
 Edmund Wilson, Notebooks of Night

Other in English
 Louise Bennett, Dialect Verses, Caribbean

Works published in other languages
Listed by nation where the work was first published and again by the poet's native land, if different; substantially revised works listed separately:

France
 Louis Aragon, Les Yeux d'Elsa
 René-Guy Cadou:
 Bruits du coeur
 Lilas du soir Paul Claudel, Cent phrases pour éventails Robert Desnos, Fortunes Paul Éluard, pen name of Paul-Eugène Grindel:
 Le livre ouvert Poésie et Vérité Pierre Emmanuel, pen name of Noël Mathieu,
 Cantos Jour de colère Léon-Paul Fargue, Refuges Jean Follain, Canisy Eugène Guillevic, Terraqué Loys Masson, Déliverez-nous du mal, war poems
 Alphonse Métérié, Prix Lasserre Henri Michaux, Au pays de la magie Saint-John Perse, pen name of Alexis Saint-Léger Léger, Exil Francis Ponge, Le parti pris des choses, 32 short to medium-length prose poems
 Raymond Queneau, Pierrot mon ami Jean Tortel, De mon vivantIndian subcontinent
Including all of the British colonies that later became India, Pakistan, Bangladesh, Sri Lanka and Nepal. Listed alphabetically by first name, regardless of surname:

Bengali
 Birendra Chattopadhyay, Grahacyta Dinesh Das, Kabita 1343–48 Jibanananda Das, Banalata SenOther Indian languages
 Akhtar Ansari Akbarabadi, Abgine, Urdu
 Hari Daryani, Koda, Sindhi-language (India)
 K. S. Narasimha Swami, Mysuru Malige, Indian, Kannada-language, called "the most famous collection of love poems in Kannada"
 N. Gopla Pillai, Sita-Vicara-Lahari, translation into Sanskrit from the Malayalam of Kumaran Asan's poem Cintavistayaya Sita Pritam Singh Safir, Pap de Sohle, Indian, Punjabi-language
 Sumitra Kumari Sinha, ' 'Asa Parva' ',  Hindi-language (India)

Other languages
 Chairil Anwar, "Nisan" ("Grave"), Indonesian
 D. Gwenallt Jones, Cnoi Cil, Welsh poet published in the United Kingdom
 Erik Lindegren, Manen utan väg ("The Man Without a Way"), Sweden
 Cesare Pavese, Lavorare stanca ("Hard Work"), expanded version nearly double the size of the first edition  published in 1936; Italy
 César Moro, pen name of César Quíspez Asín, La tortuga ecuestre, Peru
 Saint-John Perse, Exil: poème, Marseilles: Editions Cahiers du Sud; France
 Francis Ponge, Le parti pris des choses, Gallimard; France
 Stella Sierra, Sinfonía jubilosa en doce sonetos ("Joyful Symphony in Twelve Sonnets"), Panama
 Hannah Szenes, "A Walk to Caesarea", Modern Hebrew poetry

Awards and honors

 Governor General's Award, poetry or drama: David and Other Poems, Earle Birney (Canada) 

United States
 Robert Frost Medal: Edgar Lee Masters
 Pulitzer Prize for Poetry: William Rose Benét, The Dust Which Is GodBirths
Death years link to the corresponding "[year] in poetry" article:
 January 17 – Muhammad Ali (born Cassius Clay}, African-American heavyweight boxer and occasional poet (died 2016)
 January 19 – Pat Mora, female Mexican-American author and poet
 February 14 – Rafiq Azad, Bengali poet, editor and academic (died 2016)
 February 20 – Hugo Williams, English poet, journalist and travel writer
 February 22 – Peter Abbs, English poet and academic (died 2020)
 February 23 – Haki R. Madhubuti (born Don Luther Lee), African-American poet, author and academic
 March 13 – Mahmoud Darwish, Palestinian poet and prose writer
 March 23 – Ama Ata Aidoo, Ghanaian author, poet and playwright
 March 26 – Erica Jong, American author and poet
 April 10 – Stuart Dybek, American poet and author
 April 27 – Sadakazu Fujii 藤井 貞和, Japanese poet and literary scholar (surname: Fujii)
 May 22 – Souad al-Sabah, Kuwaiti poetess and writer
 June 7 – Aonghas MacNeacail, Scottish Gaelic poet (died 2022)
 June 21 – Henry S. Taylor, Pulitzer Prize-winning American poet
 August 25 – Pat Ingoldsby, Irish poet and television presenter
 September 19 – David Henderson, American poet associated with the Umbra workshop and Black Arts Movement
 October 5 –  Nick Piombino, American poet, essayist and psychotherapist, sometimes associated with Language poets because of his frequent appearance in the seminal L=A=N=G=U=A=G=E magazine early in his poetic career
 October 11 – William Corbett, American poet, essayist, editor, educator and publisher (died 2018)
 October 23 – Douglas Dunn, Scottish poet, academic and critic
 November 9 – Karin Kiwus, German poet
 November 11 – William Matthews, American poet and essayist
 November 19 – Sharon Olds, American poet
 November 27 – Marilyn Hacker, American poet, critic and reviewer
 November 28 – Eiléan Ní Chuilleanáin, Irish poet
 December 9 – David Harsent, English poet and crime novelist
 December 16
 Arthur Nortje, South African poet (died 1970)
 Peter Seaton, American associated with the Language poets
 Also:
 Gladys Cardiff, American poet and academic
 Pat Ingoldsby, Irish television presenter and poet
 Peter Klappert, American poet
 Sydney Lea, American poet
 Charles Martin, American poet, critic and translator
 Macdara Woods, Irish poet (died 2018)

Deaths
Birth years link to the corresponding "[year] in poetry" article:
 January 4 – Joan Vincent Murray (born 1917), English-born Canadian American poet
 February 2 – Daniil Kharms (born 1905), early Soviet-era surrealist and absurdist poet, writer, dramatist and founder of Oberiu poetry school, probably of starvation in his Leningrad prison asylum cell
 February 15 – Marie Heiberg (born 1890), Estonian poet, insane
 March 26 – Carolyn Wells (born 1862), American novelist and poet
 March 28 – Miguel Hernández (born 1910), Spanish poet, from tuberculosis in harsh conditions during imprisonment
 April 19 – José María Eguren (born 1874), Peruvian symbolism poet
 April 24 – Lucy Maud Montgomery, known as "L. M. Montgomery" (born 1874), Canadian poet and author best known for a series of novels beginning with Anne of Green Gables c. Early May – Jakob van Hoddis (born 1887), German-Jewish Expressionist poet, in Sobibór extermination camp
 May 7 – William Baylebridge, pseudonym of Charles William Blocksidge (born 1883), Australian poet and short story writer
 May 11 – Sakutarō Hagiwara 萩原 朔太郎 (born 1886), Taishō and early Shōwa period Japanese literary critic and free-verse poet called the "father of modern colloquial poetry in Japan" (surname: Hagiwara)
 May 12 – Shaw Neilson (born 1872), Australian poet
 May 26 – Libero Bovio (born 1883), Italian poet in the Neapolitan dialect
 May 29 – Akiko Yosano 与謝野 晶子  pen name of Yosano Shiyo (born 1878), late Meiji period, Taishō period and early Shōwa period Japanese poet, pioneering feminist, pacifist and social reformer; one of the most famous, and most controversial, post-classical woman poets of Japan (surname: Yosano)
 September 3/4 – Annie Wall Barnett (born 1859), American poet, writer, litterateur
 September 12 – Patrick R. Chalmers (born 1872), Irish writer on field sports and poet
 October 29 – Màrius Torres (born 1910), Catalan Spanish poet, from tuberculosis
 November 2 – Hakushū Kitahara 北原 白秋, pen name of Kitahara Ryūkichi 北原 隆吉 (born 1885), Taishō and Shōwa period Japanese tanka'' poet (surname: Kitahara)
 November 4 – Clementine Krämer (born 1873), German poet and short-story writer, in Theresienstadt concentration camp
 December 23 – Konstantin Balmont (born 1867), Russian Symbolist poet, in Paris

See also

 Poetry
 List of poetry awards
 List of years in poetry

Notes

20th-century poetry
Poetry